UGC 6945 (also known as Arp 194) is a trio of interacting galaxies.

As the pair of galaxies in the north gravitationally interact with each other, tidally-stripped gas from both galaxies is draped over the southern galaxy as a series of blobs, which are fueling a burst of star formation. While it has long been believed to be interacting with the northern galaxy, images from the Hubble Space Telescope clearly show that this stream of material is actually superimposed on the southern galaxy. This suggests that this third galaxy may actually lie in the background. Due to this uncertainty, the third galaxy may not be involved in the interaction.

See also
List of Hubble anniversary images

References

External links
 

Spiral galaxies
Interacting galaxies
6945
194
Ursa Major (constellation)